ThirtyTwo is the fourth studio album by Reverend and The Makers, released on 24 February 2014 by Cooking Vinyl in the UK. The album title refers to various different things: the age of lead singer Jon McClure at the time of the album's release, his father's favourite lottery number and number of the bus route near McClure's house. The album peaked at #13 in the UK Albums Chart, making it their second highest charting album behind their debut The State of Things.

The album contains a variety of songs showing many influences including electropop and ska.

Track listing

References

2014 albums
Reverend and The Makers albums
Cooking Vinyl albums
Albums produced by Youth (musician)